Stockton Township may refer to the following townships in the United States:

 Stockton Township, Greene County, Indiana
 Stockton Township, Jo Daviess County, Illinois
 Stockton Township, New Jersey